Leo Metzenbauer (15 January 1910 – 10 April 1993) was an Austrian art director.

Selected filmography
 Daughter of the Regiment (1953)
 The Schimeck Family (1957)
 The Forests Sing Forever (1959)
 Gustav Adolf's Page (1960)
 The Inheritance of Bjorndal (1960)
 The Cry of the Wild Geese (1961)
 Adorable Julia (1962)
 Our Crazy Aunts in the South Seas (1964)
 The World Revolves Around You (1964)
 Don't Get Angry (1972)

References

Bibliography
 Kaul, Walter. Schöpferische Filmarchitektur. Dt. Kinemathek, 1971.

External links

1910 births
1993 deaths
Austrian art directors
Film people from Vienna